AHK may stand for:

 AutoHotkey, a programming language
 Air Hong Kong, ICAO airline designator
 Akha language of China and Myanmar, ISO 639-3 code 
 Allied High Commission (German Alliierte Hohe Kommission), for post-WWII Germany
 Auslandshandelskammer, German chambers of commerce abroad
AHK USA